Eucalyptus nebulosa, commonly known as the serpentine peppermint, is a species of small tree that is endemic to the northwest of Tasmania. It has smooth, creamy white bark, narrow elliptic adult leaves, flower buds usually arranged in groups of between seven and eleven, pale creamy white flowers and hemispherical or more or less top-shaped fruit.

Description
Flowering occurs from December to March and the fowers are pale creamy white.

Taxonomy and naming
The specific epithet (nebulosa) is from the Latin nebulosus meaning "misty" or "cloudy", referring to the smoky or hazy effect of the bluish grey leaves from a distance.

Distribution and habitat
Serpentine peppermint is the dominant tree species on serpentinite between the Wilson and Huskisson Rivers, tributaries of the Pieman River in the northwest of Tasmania.

See also
List of Eucalyptus species

References

Flora of Tasmania
Trees of Australia
nebulosa
Myrtales of Australia
Plants described in 2008